Missing Boy is a 2019 Indian Kannada-language adventure drama film starring Gurunandan in the titular role. The film follows a missing boy from Hubbali.

Cast 
Gurunandan as Nishchay Jagadish 
Rangayana Raghu as Lavakumar
Archana Jayakrishnan 
Ravishankar Gowda
Shobhraj
Jai Jagadish
Vijayalakshmi Singh
Sumithra
 Yamuna Srinidhi 
Bhagirathi Kadam

Production 
Since the film begins in Europe, the first twenty minutes of the film are in English. Archana Jayakrishnan made her debut with this film. The film was shot in New Zealand and Karnataka.

Soundtrack 
The songs are composed by V. Harikrishna.
"Jopana" -  Vaani Harikrishna, Vijay Prakash

Reception 
A critic from The Times of India wrote that "Missing Boy is a film for those who love their family dramas replete with emotions". A critic from Cinema Express wrote that "Overall, Missing Boy paints a realistic, poignant picture of a real-life story and is a film that will surely touch your heart". A critic from Bangalore Mirror wrote that "Missing Boy is a step in the right direction for Sandalwood". A critic from Deccan Chronicle wrote that "It stands out for its values which is the driving force than the only intent to find out about the missing parents".

References